The Dimonika Biosphere Reserve (established 1988) is a UNESCO Biosphere Reserve in the Republic of the Congo.

The Mayombe has a hot, humid climate, combining tropical and oceanic traits.  A lowland Guineo-Congolese rainforest dominates the biosphere reserve together with savanna vegetation.  The area is in the transition zone between semi-deciduous and evergreen forest. Of special scientific interest are various types of forest communities recolonising old areas of forest exploitation.

The fauna within the biosphere reserve is diverse and varied.

Human activities 

Compared to other rural areas of Congo, the Mayombe Mountains are densely populated.

Many migrants from neighboring regions, Angola and the Democratic Republic of the Congo have settled within the biosphere reserve.  , there were 19,000 inhabitants in the Sous-prefécture de M’Vouti. Their main activities are subsistence agriculture, hunting, fishing and gold extraction.

The "Mayombe Project" aimed at improving the communication between local stakeholders, managers and scientists. In 1991, a survey was issued to determine perceptions and expectations of the biosphere reserve inhabitants. Research has been carried out on the impact of gold extraction on the biosphere reserve.

Sources

References 

Biosphere reserves of the Republic of the Congo